A Year at the Top is an American sitcom that aired for five episodes on CBS from August 5 to September 2, 1977. Produced by T.A.T. Communications Company, the series was created by Heywood Kling and co-executive produced by Don Kirshner and Norman Lear.

Synopsis
Based on the Faust legend, the series stars Paul Shaffer and Greg Evigan as two struggling musicians who make a pact with the son of the devil for a year of success. A Year at the Top also stars Nedra Volz, Priscilla Morrill, Gabriel Dell, and Julie Cobb.  Mickey Rooney guest-starred on the pilot episode. The series aired for only five episodes before being canceled by CBS in September 1977.

Expecting the series to be a hit, a soundtrack LP titled Greg & Paul - A Year At The Top was released by Casablanca Records (#NBLP-7068). The album's executive producer was Don Kirshner.

Cast
Greg Evigan as Greg
Paul Shaffer as Paul
Gabriel Dell as Frederick J. Hanover (aka "The Devil's Son")
Julie Cobb as Trish
Priscilla Morrill as Miss Worley
Nedra Volz as Grandma Belle Durbin

Episodes

References

External links
 

1977 American television series debuts
1977 American television series endings
1970s American musical comedy television series
1970s American sitcoms
American fantasy television series
CBS original programming
English-language television shows
Television series by Sony Pictures Television
Television shows set in Idaho